Hernáez is a rare, shortened variant of the more popular Hernández, without the nd. Notable people with the surname include:
Josu Hernáez (born 1985), Spanish footballer
Constancio Hernáez (born 1957), Spanish composer

Spanish-language surnames